Himmel og helvete (Heaven and Hell) is a Norwegian propaganda film from 1969 directed by Øyvind Vennerød with a screenplay by Vennerød and Victor Borg. The film was poorly received by the critics, but it nonetheless became one of the highest-grossing theater films in Norway in 1969. Lillebjørn Nilsen and Sigrid Huun played the main characters Arne and Eva.

Plot
The film's action takes place in Oslo. It begins with a housewife coming home and finding her daughter Ingrid half-dead from using drugs. The daughter dies a few hours later in the hospital. While the police search Ingrid's room, the pusher Johan shows up. The police find him suspicious, but they have no authority to arrest him. It later turns out that Johan works for the Yugoslav drug dealer Zatek, who smuggles hashish from Sweden using car tires. The student Oddvar also appears in the story; he also works for Zatek.

Later in the film, we meet two young people from the west end of Oslo, Eva and Arne, who hear the liberal psychologist Orheim claim that hashish is a harmless drug at a lecture during a high school assembly. At a party, the two young people together with some other students decide to smoke hashish that their friend Arne has stolen from his brother Oddvar. After smoking the drug a couple of times, Eva and Arne want to get more. They first smoke the rest of what was left after the party. Later, Arne steals hashish from Oddvar, and at the same time Eva loses interest in her schoolwork. In desperation, both students ask Oddvar where they can get more hashish—to which Oddvar mentions Zatek, who works out of Club 13 (a reference to Club 7). Eva goes to bed with Zatek to get hashish. Zatek later becomes suspicious and kills Oddvar with a knife. While Eva's parents try to find out what is wrong with their daughter, and hear about Orheim's lecture at Club 13, Arne and Eva establish a connection with some hippies in Palace Park. They both spend the night with their new acquaintances in a condemned apartment in downtown Oslo.

Zatek is deported to Sweden after the authorities suspect that he is behind the murder of Oddvar. Eva, on the other hand, is admitted to a detox clinic. After a while, Eva escapes with Arne to Copenhagen to try new drugs. When Eva's mother learns that her daughter has run away, she is shocked. Eva's father kills Orheim with a paperweight. In Denmark, Eva and Lars end up in money trouble, and Eva begins prostituting herself to earn money for more drugs. During a wild LSD trip, Arne jumps from the roof over his hotel window and dies. The film ends with Eva in an LSD trip seeing herself in the mirror as a skinned corpse.

Cast

 Sigrid Huun as Eva Falck
 Lillebjørn Nilsen as Arne
 Georg Richter as Ivar Falck
 Randi Kolstad as Berit, Eva's mother (credited as Randi Borch)
 Per Tofte as Zatek, a drug dealer
 Pål Skjønberg as Hermansen, a policeman
 Svein Sturla Hungnes as Rasmussen
 Per Jansen as Johan, Zatek's accomplice
 Arne Aas as Orheim, a psychologist
 Ingrid Øvre Wiik as Mrs. Lauritzen (credited as Ingrid Øvre)
 Arne Bang-Hansen as Trosdahl, a chief physician
 Kari Diesen as Arne's grandmother
 Svein Skaara as Knut Brenden
 Odd Jan Sandsdalen as a poet
 Ole Medbøe as Ole
 Inger Lise Rypdal as a pop singer
 Peter Anker as Per
 Elisabeth Bang as Mrs. Brenden
 Vibeke Falk as Aas, a teacher
 Egil Hjorth-Jenssen as a pawn operator
 Kirsten Oldgard as Bitten
 Kari Sunde as Randi 
 Marianne Trosdahl		
 Flemming Nielsen
 Bjørn Puggaard-Müller		
 Vivi-Ann

References

External links 
 
 Himmel og helvete at the National Library of Norway
 Himmel og helvete at the Swedish Film Database
 Himmel og helvete at the Danish national Film Institute

1969 films
Norwegian drama films
1960s Norwegian-language films
Propaganda films
Films directed by Øyvind Vennerød